Torsten Krol is an Australian writer resident in Queensland. He is the author of the FOREVERMAN series of novels (2018-2021). He is best known for his novels The Dolphin People (2006), a postmodern "parable" of a World War II-era German family lost in the South American jungle, and Callisto (2007), a "nightmarishly amusing" satire on modern day American attitudes to terrorism, post-9/11, which was translated into 22 languages.

Authorial controversy 
Described as "reclusive", Krol does not make personal appearances to promote his work, and there has been media speculation about his identity; among others, The Sunday Star-Times and ABC's The Book Show have questioned whether he might be a better known author writing under a pseudonym.

In April 2018, a few days prior to the publication of Krol's new novel series, FOREVERMAN, a German author published a piece of non-fiction literary criticism postulating possible identities of Torsten Krol.

There are only two known interviews with Torsten Krol, the first of which was granted to Harper Perennial in conjunction with its publication of Callisto in the United States, and the second of which was granted to novelist Steven S. Drachman for Audere Magazine in June 2019.

Bibliography

References

External links 
Foreverman book series by Torsten Krol
Review of Callisto in The Independent
Torsten Krol as a pseudonym of Stephen King

21st-century Australian novelists
Australian male novelists
Year of birth missing (living people)
Living people
21st-century Australian male writers
21st-century pseudonymous writers